Gaston About (17 March 1890 - 13 February 1954) was a French politician.

About was born in Bruyères. He belonged to the Republican Federation and was a member of the Chamber of Deputies for Haute-Saône from 1919 to 1932.

References

1890 births
1954 deaths
People from Vosges (department)
Politicians from Grand Est
Republican Federation politicians
Members of the 12th Chamber of Deputies of the French Third Republic
Members of the 13th Chamber of Deputies of the French Third Republic
Members of the 14th Chamber of Deputies of the French Third Republic
French military personnel of World War I